Zebulon Baird Vance is a bronze sculpture commemorating the Confederate colonel and governor of the same name by Gutzon Borglum, installed in the United States Capitol as part of the National Statuary Hall Collection. The statue was donated to the collection by the state of North Carolina, and was accepted by the Senate on 22 June 1916.

See also

 1916 in art
 List of Confederate monuments and memorials

References

External links
 

1916 establishments in the United States
Bronze sculptures in Washington, D.C.
Confederate States of America monuments and memorials in Washington, D.C.
Sculptures of men in Washington, D.C.
Vance
Sculptures by Gutzon Borglum
Governor of North Carolina